Peter Bird may refer to:

 Peter Bird (IT manager) (1934–2017), British computer operator
 Peter Bird (footballer) (born 1976), Australian rules footballer
 Peter Bird (rower) (died 1996), British ocean rower